A concrete canoe is a canoe made of concrete, typically created for an engineering competition.

In spirit, the event is similar to that of a cardboard boat race—make the seemingly unfloatable float.  However, since concrete and other poured surfaces are an integral part of a civil engineer's education, concrete canoes typically feature more development than cardboard boats.

Principles
Ignoring hydrodynamic effects, all ships or boats float because the weight of the water they displace is equal to the weight of the boat (Archimedes' principle).  However, many boats are made of materials that are denser than water, meaning that the boat will sink if filled with water.  Although it is not required by the rules of the competition, some competitive concrete canoes have concrete mix designs that are less dense than water. They must pass a test in which the canoe is filled with water and pushed below the surface; the canoe must then resurface in order to qualify for racing. This is possible because, unlike normal concrete which uses sand and small rocks, concrete canoes are created with porous aggregates such as Macrolite and microspheres. However, because many teams still design their concrete mixes to be denser than water, in the United States, teams are allowed to insert concrete-covered, non-structural foam pieces in their canoes to make the canoes float after being submerged.

ASCE National Competition
The ASCE (American Society of Civil Engineers) National Concrete Canoe Competition (NCCC) provides students with a practical application of the engineering principles they learn in the classroom, along with important team and project management skills they will need in their careers.  The event challenges the students' knowledge, creativity and stamina, while showcasing the versatility and durability of concrete as a building material.

Each year, the NCCC, which is held in mid-June, is hosted by an ASCE Student Organization.  Some 200 university teams attempt to qualify for the NCCC by placing first in one of the 18 conference competitions held throughout the United States during the spring.  Until 2018, teams placing second in a conference competition behind a university that finished in the top five at the previous year's national competition are also invited. This was replaced by the Wild Card drawing in 2018. If the Concrete Canoe team was part of a student chapter that placed within the top one-third of all annual reports, and the team finished within the top half of all teams in their regional competition, the team was eligible for the Wild Card drawing. Of all qualifying team, six were randomly drawn to attend the 2018 National Concrete Competition. To be eligible to compete in the Concrete Canoe Competition, the entrant school must be a recognized ASCE Student Chapter or ASCE International Student Group. Typically, frontrunners include University of Alabama in Huntsville, University of Nevada, Reno, University of Florida, California Polytechnic State University San Luis Obispo, the University of California at Berkeley, Clemson University, École de technologie supérieure, Université Laval, and the University of Wisconsin–Madison.

The winners of the ASCE National Concrete Canoe Competition are determined by compiling the team's total number of points from the academic and race portions of the competition.  Academic scholarships totaling $9,000 are awarded to the winning teams' undergraduate civil engineering program.

History

Concrete Canoe competition in the United States began in the 1960s, when a small number of ASCE student chapters began holding intramural Concrete Canoe races. Then, in the 1971, the University of Illinois at Urbana-Champaign held the first intercollegiate race against Purdue. In the more than 45 years since, the students’ efforts to combine engineering excellence and hydrodynamic design to construct water-worthy canoes have culminated in an advanced form of concrete construction and racing technique known as the “America’s Cup of Civil Engineering.”

In 1981 as part of the FIP congress in Stockholm, Sweden there was the 1st FIP international concrete canoe race. won by the Danish team from Technical University of Denmark. inspired by Herbert Krenchel

In 1988, ASCE expanded the competition to the national level, when Master Builders, Inc. (now known as BASF) signed-on to become the sole corporate sponsor for the event. In its first year, 18 teams of enthusiastic civil engineering students from the nation's premier academic programs gathered in East Lansing, Mich., to test the waters of this innovative and educational event. Over the next two decades, the competition became a great success, with regional winners traveling across the country by plane, train and Ryder truck, canoes in tow, in their quest to become National Concrete Canoe Competition champions.

As competition was developing in the United States, the idea had also taken hold in other countries. Today, concrete canoe racing happens around the world in places like Germany, South Africa, Canada, Japan and the United Arab Emirates; and with sponsorship from ASCE and the American Concrete Institute (ACI), the 2007 National Concrete Canoe Competition winning team, University of Wisconsin - Madison, travelled to the Netherlands to represent the United States in the 30th Annual Dutch Concrete Canoe Challenge.

The Concrete Canoe Competition is designed to provide civil engineering students with an opportunity to gain hands-on, practical experience and leadership skills by working with concrete mix designs and project management. Organizers, sponsors and participants are dedicated to building awareness of concrete technology and application, as well as the versatility and durability of concrete as a construction material, among civil engineering students, educators, practitioners, the concrete industry and the general public. They also strive to increase awareness among industry leaders, opinion makers and the general public of civil engineering as a dynamic and innovative profession essential to society. In its history, the National Concrete Canoe Competition has challenged the knowledge, creativity and stamina of more than 400 teams and 5000 students. In 2008, more than 200 teams competed in 18 conference competitions to qualify for participation at the national level.

Past winners

National sponsors
Sponsors include BASF, Kiewit Corporation, American Concrete Institute, Holcim, Bentley Systems, Cemex, and Propex.

Requirements and preparation
Teams of engineering students will gather for a weekend designed to be both challenging and fun. Twenty-five percent of each team's total team score will be based on the engineering design and construction principles used in the creation of their concrete canoe; 25 percent will be based on a technical design report detailing the planning, development, testing and construction of their canoe; and 25 percent will be based on a formal business presentation highlighting the canoe's design, construction, racing ability and other innovative features. The remaining 25 percent of each team's score is based on the performance of the canoe and the paddlers in five different race events: men's and women's slalom/endurance races, and men's, women's and co-ed sprint races.

For the purpose of the competition, concrete is defined as a mixture of cement, of which at least 30% (by mass) must be Portland cement, and aggregate, which must constitute at least 25% (by volume) of the mix.  The aggregate need not be conventional construction aggregate (sand, etc.), but may include materials such as hollow glass beads and fibers.  Epoxy is not permitted. Up to 50% of the thickness of the canoe may be a reinforcement mesh.
 
Concrete canoe teams must design their canoes from scratch. Typically they create the shape of the hull with a computer design program specifically made for yachts, canoes, and other watercraft. The shape is optimized for racing. This hull shape is then given to a construction team, responsible for making a mold for the canoe to be formed on. A special concrete mix is designed over several months, emphasizing among other qualities, an optimal balance between strength and low density. The finalized mix design is placed on the form; the hull thickness usually ranges from about 3/8" to 3/4". Teams later spend hundreds of hours sanding and applying exterior graphics to their canoes for a nice finish. Scoring in the competition is based on the quality of construction, race performance, a design paper, and a business presentation.

Canadian Concrete Canoe

Statistics

National news

National appearance

 École de Technologie Supérieure
 École Polytechnique de Montréal
 McGill University
 Queen's University
 St-Clair College 
 University of Windsor
 University of Manitoba
 Université de Moncton
 Université de Sherbrooke
 Université Laval
 University of Toronto
 University of/d' Ottawa
 University of Waterloo
 University of Western Ontario
 Ryerson University (now TMU)
 University of British Columbia
 Concordia University
 University of Victoria
 Université du Québec à Chicoutimi
 Dalhousie University

Concrete canoe community

Concrete canoe competitions have a significant following from both present and past competitors.  The concrete canoe community now includes a dedicated concrete canoe news website, ConcreteCanoe.org, which follows competitions around the world, as well as Concrete Canoe Magazine, which publishes scientific papers, studies, and articles written on the techniques used by top teams.

See also 
 Concrete ship
 Great Northern Concrete Toboggan Race

References

External links 
 ConcreteCanoe.org
 Concrete Canoe Magazine
 2018 National Concrete Canoe Competition Rules and Regulations
 2018 National Concrete Canoe Competition Rules Page
 2018 National Concrete Canoe Competition Main Site (USA)
 University of Nevada: Reno Concrete Canoe at University of Nevada, Reno
 University of California: Berkeley Concrete Canoe at University of California, Berkeley
 Concrete Canoe Collection from the ASCE Library
 "Team UAH" at University of Alabama, Huntsville
 Concrete Canoes in Germany
 University of Twente (NL), The BetonBrouwers Team

Canadian National Concrete Canoe Competition 
 Canadian National Concrete Canoe Competition Home Page
 CNCCC 2013 at the École de technologie supérieure
 CNCCC 2010 at the University of Toronto
 Canoë de l'École de technologie supérieure at École de technologie supérieure
 Canoë de l'école Polytechnique at École Polytechnique de Montréal
 University of/d' Ottawa Concrete Canoe  at University of Ottawa
 Canoë de l'Université de Sherbrooke at Université de Sherbrooke

Canoes
Concrete
American Society of Civil Engineers